"The Blockade Runners" is an 1865 novella by Jules Verne. In 1871 it was published in single volume together with novel A Floating City as a part of the Voyages Extraordinaires series (The Extraordinary Voyages). An English translation was published in 1874.

Plot introduction
The American Civil War plot centers on the exploits of a British merchant captain named James Playfair who must break the Union blockade of Charleston harbor in South Carolina to trade supplies for cotton and, later in the book, to rescue Halliburtt, the abolitionist journalist father of a young girl held prisoner (the father, not the girl) by the Confederates.  Verne's tale was inspired by reality as many ships were actually lost while acting as blockade runners in and around Charleston in the early 1860s.

Adaptations
The book was produced as a radio play of the same name in 2006.

References

External links 

 Les forceurs de blocus, full original French text
 17 illustrations  by Jules Férat
 

1865 short stories
Short stories by Jules Verne
American Civil War fiction
Novels set on ships